The 2013 Tohoku Rakuten Golden Eagles season was the 8th season of the franchise in Nippon Professional Baseball, also their 8th season under Rakuten, also their 8th season at then-named Nippon Paper Kleenex Stadium (now Rakuten Seimei Park Miyagi), and also their 8th season in Sendai. The Eagles were managed by Senichi Hoshino in his 3rd season managing the Eagles. The Eagles won their first and only Pacific League pennant and their first and only Japan Series championship as of 2022.

Regular season 
The Eagles finished with the best record in Pacific League, finishing the season at 82-59-3 (.582).

Playoffs 
The Eagles defeated the Chiba Lotte Marines in the Climax Series, then defeated the Yomiuri Giants in the Japan Series.

References 

Tohoku Rakuten Golden Eagles seasons
Nippon Professional Baseball